The Amazonian black tyrant (Knipolegus poecilocercus) is a species of bird in the family Tyrannidae. It is found in subtropical or tropical swamps in Brazil, Colombia, Ecuador, Guyana, Peru, and Venezuela.

Description
The males are readily identified by their shiny black body, blue hooded head and light blue bills. The females more drab-coloured, with an olive brown body, lighter underside and streaked wing lining, with a reddish brown lining on the inner tail feathers.

References

Amazonian black tyrant
Birds of the Amazon Basin
Birds of the Venezuelan Amazon
Amazonian black tyrant
Taxonomy articles created by Polbot